Adrian Flux is an insurance broker that has its head office at East Winch Hall in King's Lynn, Norfolk.

Founded in 1973, the company has become one of the country’s largest specialist motor insurance brokers and employs more than 1,500 staff.

History 

The family-run business was formed by Adrian Flux.

In 1990, it expanded by creating a specialist motorcycle division called Bikesure. As of 2017, it now has its own office in North Lynn, Norfolk.

In 1999, Adrian’s son David took over the running of the company after working his way up from the position of a clerk.

In 2005, the company acquired Bishop’s Stortford-based Herts Insurance Consultants (HIC). This has since been rebranded as Sterling Insurance.

In 2010, more than 3,000 extra policyholders were gained when Adrian Flux acquired Chartwell, a provider of insurance for disabled drivers. The companies already had historical links with Chartwell trading under the name Adrian Flux until 1973 when Adrian, a disabled driver himself  moved his business from Middlesex to Norfolk and June Richardson started to run Chartwell as its own entity.

In 2016, Adrian Flux gained huge publicity as a result of launching what it described as the UK’s and “possibly the world’s” first driverless car insurance policy.

In 2017, Adrian Flux stepped in to save more than 100 jobs at the Norwich branch of Swinton Insurance by taking over the lease of its call centre that was due to close. This gave the company its first office in the city.

In 2020, the drive to expand continued with 185 people being hired as the business adapted to working remotely during the COVID-19 lockdowns.

In 2022, the drive to recruit and grow gathered pace thanks to the success of introducing a pioneering flexible staff-led way of working.

Awards 

Adrian Flux has won numerous awards for its offerings:

• Total 911 Magazine Best Porsche Insurance Specialist 2015 

• WhatVan? Insurer of the Year 2019  2021  2023 

• Intelligent Instructor Driving Instructor of the Year 2019  2021  2022  2023

Marketing

Sponsorship 
Adrian Flux has had sponsorship deals with a number of high-profile figures in motorsport over the years including British Touring Car Championship legend Jason Plato, and single-seater racer Callum Ilott.

It’s been the title sponsor of BTCC’s Team BMR and all-disabled motorsport outfit Team BRIT, agreed a long-term naming rights deal with the King's Lynn Stadium motorcycle speedway, banger racing and stock car venue and became the lead brand associated with the British FIM Speedway Grand Prix.

The company has also thrown its backing behind King's Lynn Town F.C. by sponsoring the club’s main stand, supported the town’s Festival Too music extravaganza, invested in the Lap of Anglia, a cycling fundraising event  and helped protect the future and viability of The Waterfront, an entertainment and nightclub venue in Norwich.

Content 

Adrian Flux has gained brand awareness through a variety of content-based marketing including Influx, a digital online motoring magazine  and award-winning automotive podcast Fuelling Around.

References

External links

Profile in Eastern Daily Press
Profile of Senior Partner, David Flux, with company background - Part of EDP Power 100 Influential Business People of East Anglia
Further Info on the company's expansion from EDP
Article in Lynn News
Article on Flux Babes
Coverage of Auto Express poll
 EDP coverage of Chartwell acquisition
 Lynn News Article on 40th Anniversary Art Exhibition
 Your Local Paper coverage of Ruby promotion
 Adrian Flux Grandstand naming
 Your Local Paper coverage of Adrian Flux Arena naming

Insurance companies of the United Kingdom
Financial services companies established in 1974